Łążek may refer to the following places:
Łążek, Kuyavian-Pomeranian Voivodeship (north-central Poland)
Łążek, Łódź Voivodeship (central Poland)
Łążek, Świętokrzyskie Voivodeship (south-central Poland)
Łążek, Subcarpathian Voivodeship (south-east Poland)
Łążek, Masovian Voivodeship (east-central Poland)
Łążek, Greater Poland Voivodeship (west-central Poland)
Łążek, Pomeranian Voivodeship (north Poland)
Łążek, Warmian-Masurian Voivodeship (north Poland)